The Kansas State Board of Nursing (KSBN) is the State of Kansas' nursing regulatory agency. Its stated mission is to "Protect the Public Health, Safety and Welfare of the Citizens of Kansas through the Licensure and Regulation Process."

References

External links
Official website
Licensing Division
Annual Reports of the Kansas State Board of Nursing, 1997-present
View Board of Nursing publications at State Library of Kansas' KGI Online Library

State agencies of Kansas
Boards of nursing in the United States
Medical and health organizations based in Kansas